Hermanus Pieter "Dick" Loggere (6 May 1921 – 30 December 2014) was a Dutch field hockey player who competed in the 1948 Summer Olympics and in the 1952 Summer Olympics. He was born in Amsterdam.

In 1948 he was a member of the Dutch field hockey team, which won the bronze medal. He played all seven matches as halfback.

Four years later he won the silver medal as part of the Dutch team. He played all three matches as halfback.

He was the founder of the Loggere Metaalwerken company.

External links
 
  Dutch Olympic Committee
profile
Loggere Metaalwerken

1921 births
2014 deaths
Dutch male field hockey players
Olympic field hockey players of the Netherlands
Field hockey players at the 1948 Summer Olympics
Field hockey players at the 1952 Summer Olympics
Olympic silver medalists for the Netherlands
Olympic bronze medalists for the Netherlands
Field hockey players from Amsterdam
Olympic medalists in field hockey
Medalists at the 1952 Summer Olympics
Medalists at the 1948 Summer Olympics
20th-century Dutch people
21st-century Dutch people